Bilton-in-Ainsty with Bickerton is a civil parish in the Harrogate district of North Yorkshire, England. According to the 2001 census it had a population of 512, reducing to 463 at the 2011 Census.

The parish contains Bilton-in-Ainsty and Bickerton, which are about three miles east of Wetherby in West Yorkshire.

References

Civil parishes in North Yorkshire